Ryan Kelly (born January 29, 1976) is an American comic book artist, known for his work on books such as Lucifer and Local.

Career
In 1998, Kelly graduated from the Minneapolis College of Art and Design where he studied under comic book artist Peter Gross. He worked with Gross on the DC Comics series Lucifer and The Books of Magic, both under the Vertigo imprint.  He is now on the MCAD staff, teaching the occasional inking class, as well as classes for younger students.  He has also moved on to work on other books, including guest inking responsibilities on American Virgin and penciling duties for AiT/PlanetLar's Giant Robot Warriors with Stuart Moore.

In addition to his comics art work he has had various Minneapolis area exhibitions of his painted work.  He has produced illustrations for Time Magazine and Rolling Stone, among others.

He illustrated the entire twelve issue run of the Oni Press comics series Local, written by Brian Wood and a story arc ("The Cross + the Hammer") for Wood's Northlanders, Currently he is illustrating the  DC/Vertigo ongoing series Saucer Country by Paul Cornell (March 2010)

Bibliography

Comics work includes:

Books of Magic #57, 62, 68, 70 (pencils (57, 62, 68) and inks (70), with Bronwyn Carlton, DC Vertigo, 1999–2000)
Lucifer #5-75 (inks, with Mike Carey, DC Vertigo, 2000–2006)
Local (with Brian Wood, Oni Press, 2005–2008)
American Virgin #18-19, 22 (pencils, with Steven T. Seagle, DC Vertigo, 2006 & 2008)
The New York Four (with Brian Wood, Minx, 2007)
The New York Five #1-5 (DC Vertigo, 2011)
Northlanders #11-16 "The Cross + The Hammer" (with Brian Wood, DC Vertigo, 2008–2009)
DMZ #42-44 "No Future" (with Brian Wood, DC Vertigo, 2009)
Side B: The Music Lover's Comic Anthology #108-114 "Torso" (with his wife Kat Vapid (writer), Poseur Ink, 2009)
Star Wars #7-9 (with Brian Wood, Dark Horse, 2013)
Survivors' Club (DC Vertigo, 2015–2016)

References

External links

Ryan Kelly's Art Blog
Ryan Kelly's MNArtists.org page
New York Four synopsis at Mergingminds.org

Interviews

[https://web.archive.org/web/20061005115932/http://www.avclub.com/content/node/44629&rss=1 Interview with the Onion's AV Club]
[https://web.archive.org/web/20040202164323/http://www.citypages.com/databank/25/1208/article11841.asp Interview with the Twin Cities City Pages]

Living people
1976 births
American comics artists